The Devecikonağı Dam is a gravity dam on Emet Stream about  south of Devecikonağı in Bursa Province, Turkey. The primary purpose of the dam is to generate hydroelectric power and it has a 29 MW power station. To regulate water flow into the dam's reservoir and produce power more consistently, Kizkayasi Dam is planned upstream.

See also

List of dams and reservoirs in Turkey

References

Dams in Bursa Province
Hydroelectric power stations in Turkey
Dams completed in 2012
Gravity dams
Energy infrastructure completed in 2012
Mustafakemalpaşa
Roller-compacted concrete dams
21st-century architecture in Turkey